The discus throw, also known as disc throw, is a track and field event in which an athlete throws a heavy disc—called a discus—in an attempt to mark a farther distance than their competitors. It is an ancient sport, as demonstrated by the fifth-century-BC Myron statue Discobolus. Although not part of the current pentathlon, it was one of the events of the ancient Greek pentathlon, which can be dated back to at least 708 BC, and it is part of the modern decathlon.

History

The sport of throwing the discus traces back to it being an event in the original Olympic Games of Ancient Greece. The discus as a sport was resurrected in Magdeburg, Germany, by gymnastics teacher Christian Georg Kohlrausch and his students in the 1870s. Organized men's competition was resumed in the late 19th century, and has been a part of the modern Summer Olympic Games since the first modern competition, the 1896 Summer Olympics. Images of discus throwers figured prominently in advertising for early modern Games, such as fundraising stamps for the 1896 Games, and the main posters for the 1920 and 1948 Summer Olympics. Today the sport of discus is a routine part of modern track-and-field meets at all levels, and retains a particularly iconic place in the Olympic Games.

The first modern athlete to throw the discus while rotating the whole body was František Janda-Suk from Bohemia (the present Czech Republic). Janda-Suk invented this technique when studying the position of the famous statue of Discobolus. After only one year of developing the technique, he earned a silver medal in the 1900 Olympics.

Women's competition began in the first decades of the 20th century.  Following competition at national and regional levels, it was added to the Olympic program for the 1928 games.

Regulations
The event consists of throwing a  disc, with the weight or size depending on the competitor. Men and women throw different sized discs, with varying sizes and weights depending on age. The weight of the discus is either governed by the World Athletics for international or USA Track & Field for the United States.

In the United States, Henry Canine advocated for a lighter-weight discus in high school competition.  His suggestion was adopted by the National High School Athletic Association in 1938.

The typical discus has sides made of plastic, wood, fiberglass, carbon fiber or metal with a metal rim and a metal core to attain the weight. The rim must be smooth, with no roughness or finger holds. A discus with more weight in the rim produces greater angular momentum for any given spin rate, and thus more stability, although it is more difficult to throw. However, a higher rim weight, if thrown correctly, can lead to a longer throw. In some competitions, a solid rubber discus is used (see in the United States).

The thrower typically takes an initial stance facing away from the direction of the throw. They then spin anticlockwise (for right-handers)  times while staying within the circle to build momentum before releasing the discus. The discus must land within a 34.92º circular sector that is centered on the throwing circle. The rules of competition for discus are virtually identical to those of shot put, except that the circle is larger, a stop board is not used and there are no form rules concerning how the discus is to be thrown.

The basic motion is a fore-handed sidearm movement. The discus is spun off the index finger or the middle finger of the throwing hand. In flight the disc spins clockwise when viewed from above for a right-handed thrower, and anticlockwise for a left-handed thrower. As well as achieving maximum momentum in the discus on throwing, the discus' distance is also determined by the trajectory the thrower imparts, as well as the aerodynamic behavior of the discus. Generally, throws into a moderate headwind achieve the maximum distance. Also, a faster-spinning discus imparts greater gyroscopic stability. The technique of discus throwing is quite difficult to master and needs much experience to perfect; thus most top throwers are 30 years old or more.

Phases
The discus technique can be broken down into phases. The purpose is to transfer from the back to the front of the throwing circle while turning through one and a half circles. The speed of delivery is high, and speed is built up during the throw (slow to fast). Correct technique involves the buildup of torque so that maximum force can be applied to the discus on delivery.

Initially, the thrower takes up their position in the throwing circle, distributing their body weight evenly over both feet, which are roughly shoulder width apart. They crouch in order to adopt a more efficient posture to start from whilst also isometrically preloading their muscles; this will allow them to start faster and achieve a more powerful throw. They then begin the wind-up, which sets the tone for the entire throw; the rhythm of the wind-up and throw is very important.

Focusing on rhythm can bring about the consistency to get in the right positions that many throwers lack. Executing a sound discus throw with solid technique requires perfect balance. This is due to the throw being a linear movement combined with a one and a half rotation and an implement at the end of one arm. Thus, a good discus thrower needs to maintain balance within the circle.

For a right handed thrower, the next stage is to move the weight over the left foot. From this position the right foot is raised, and the athlete 'runs' across the circle. There are various techniques for this stage where the leg swings out to a small or great extent, some athletes turn on their left heel (e.g. Ilke Wylluda) but turning on the ball of the foot is far more common.

The aim is to land in the 'power position', the right foot should be in the center and the heel should not touch the ground at any point. The left foot should land very quickly after the right. Weight should be mostly over the back foot with as much torque as possible in the body—so the right arm is high and far back. This is very hard to achieve.

The critical stage is the delivery of the discus, from this 'power position' the hips drive through hard, and will be facing the direction of the throw on delivery. Athletes employ various techniques to control the end-point and recover from the throw, such as fixing feet (to pretty much stop dead), or an active reverse spinning onto the left foot (e.g. Virgilijus Alekna).

Sports scientist Richard Ganslen researched the Aerodynamics of the Discus, reporting the discus will stall at an angle of 29°.

Culture
The discus throw has been the subject of a number of well-known ancient Greek statues and Roman copies such as the Discobolus and Discophoros. The discus throw also appears repeatedly in ancient Greek mythology, featured as a means of manslaughter in the cases of Hyacinth, Crocus, Phocus, and Acrisius, and as a named event in the funeral games of Patroclus.

Discus throwers have been selected as a main motif in numerous collectors' coins. One of the recent samples is the €10 Greek Discus commemorative coin, minted in 2003 to commemorate the 2004 Summer Olympics. On the obverse of the coin a modern athlete is seen in the foreground in a half-turned position, while in the background an ancient discus thrower has been captured in a lively bending motion, with the discus high above his head, creating a vivid representation of the sport.

All-time top 25

Men
Correct as of August 2022.

Notable series
At the 2019 Diamond League Meeting in Doha, Qatar, Daniel Ståhl became the first man to produce six throws beyond 69.50 in a single competition.

Annulled marks
Ben Plucknett also threw a world record of 72.34 in Stockholm on 7 July 1981. This performance was annulled due to doping offences.
Kamy Keshmiri threw 70.84 in Salinas on 27 May 1992. This performance was annulled due to doping offences.

Non-legal marks
Rickard Bruch also threw 72.18 at an exhibition meeting in Piteå on 23 July 1974.
John Powell also threw 72.08 in Klagshamn on 11 September 1987, but the throw was made onto a sloping/downhill sector.

Women
Correct as of May 2022.

Annulled marks
Daniela Costian of Romania threw a best of 73.48 in Bucharest on 30 April 1988. This performance was annulled due to doping offences.
Darya Pishchalnikova of Russia threw a best of 70.69 in Cheboksary on 5 July 2012. This performance was annulled due to doping offences.

Non-legal marks
Martina Hellmann also threw 78.14 at an unofficial meeting in Berlin on 6 September 1988.
Ilke Wyludda also threw 75.36 at an unofficial meeting in Berlin on 6 September 1988.

Olympic medalists

Men

Women

World Championships medalists

Men

Women

Season's bests

Men

Women

See also
 List of discus throw national champions (men)
 United States champions in women's discus throw

Notes and references

External links

World Record
Discus History
IAAF list of discus-throw records in XML

 
Events in track and field
Athletic culture based on Greek antiquity
Ancient Olympic sports
Throwing sports
Summer Olympic disciplines in athletics